Legislative elections were held in Mongolia on 28 June 2012 to elect 76 members of the State Great Khural. Also held during the parliamentary elections was the Ulaanbaatar city council election, the first time both have been held at the same time. For the first time, the election used vote counting machines by new legislative election laws to make the election fair.

Electoral system
A new legislative election law introduced the status of domestic election observers who are nominated by civil society organisations. Parties had to announce 48 candidates for constituency seats and 28 candidates for proportional allocation. Among the changes was also a quota of 20% of seats reserved for women.

Parties
On 24 May the Democratic Party (DP) and Mongolian People's Party (MPP) announced their candidates for the election. A new party that participated was Mongolian People's Revolutionary Party which was established in 2010 by Nambaryn Enkhbayar.

Prior to January, the Democratic Party was a part of the grand coalition in government with the Mongolian People's Party, but later withdrew to focus on the campaign.

Campaign
A large share of the posters were for individual candidates, though showing party logos, which were perceived as being aimed at voters in specific constituencies. By contrast, advertising on television was much broader and much more focused on the parties.

A spate of mining concessions to foreign companies has led to an influx of money into the country. This was also followed by accusations of corruption and a lack of accountability over the political leadership for squandering the country's natural resources and at least tacitly tolerating the mistreatment of Mongolian workers at mines operated by foreign companies. All political parties campaigned against corruption before the election. Mining and Energy Minister Dashdorjiin Zorigt said that "the only way out of this situation is to have more growth that is more just." According to the opinion polling firm, Sumati Luvsandendev, 90% of Mongolians believe that politicians benefit from some form of "special arrangements" over mining concessions to foreign companies. Rapper Tugsjargal Munkherdene, also known as "Gee," partook in campaigning against corruption. including a controversial video clip against the alleged exploitation by ethnic Chinese. As a result of public pressure, there was a speculation of tightening restrictions for investment in the mining sector after the election.

The MPRP campaigned on a platform of "resource nationalism." Reuters suggested its participation in government could impact the mining sector, including the Tavan Tolgoi coal project, which the MPRP wants controlled by Mongolians. Other issues included variations by the parties on how to use the windfall from mining concessions most efficiently, including pensions, infrastructure and other subsidies for local industries. The Democratic Party expressed it was best placed to help the poor and unemployed, while calling the Mongolian People's Party held to the elite and foreign mining interests.

Opinion polls
The Sant Maral Foundation and analysts had suggested that the Democratic Party would get a small plurality over the Mongolian People's Party, though neither party would get a majority.

Conduct
The polling stations were open from 7:00 to 20:00. Voting took place using electronic voting machines (EVMs) for the first time. The voting machines were set up by the Canadian company Dominion Voting Systems to report results immediately to the General Election Committee rather than any kind of tabulation by the local election officials. Of the 1,833,000 eligible voters, 65% turned out to vote. There were 544 candidates, of which 174 were women.

Upon voting, President Tsakhiagiin Elbegdorj said "Today, we Mongolians face an important time to make a historic choice to address Mongolia's development and democracy."

Results

Four seats were unfilled following the elections; in two constituencies the winning candidate received less than 28% of the vote, while the victory of two MPP candidates were annulled due to breaches of electoral law.

Reactions
Mongolian President Tsakhiagiin Elbegdorj pointed out he was led to believe that all parties had so far accepted the result thus a coalition is likely to be formed in August. He then added that "the Mongolian People's Party seems to be losing to the Democratic Party" and that he "hope[s] that Mongolia is going to make great progress towards democracy, justice and prosperity."

On 30 June the Mongolian People's Party and eight smaller parties called for a new election with manual hand counting throughout every constituency in the country. MPP Secretary Yangug Sodbaatar said that the EVMs "violated the constitution. We are [thus] demanding the traditional system of counting votes by hand in every election constituency across the whole country to end this confusion that the population has about the voting machines and automated systems." However, the Democratic Party did not sign a petition to call for a new election, backing the automated system.

As a result of the election, the Democratic Party became the majority at the parliament. The Democratic Party formed a coalition government with Mongolian People's Revolutionary Party and Civil Will-Green Party in August 2012. The Mongolian People's Party became the opposition at the parliament.

References

Elections in Mongolia
Mongolia
Legislative